Prince Andrew School is the only secondary school on the island of Saint Helena, a British territory in the Atlantic Ocean.

It caters to years 7-13 and was opened in 1989 with Mark Taylor presiding.

Its 25th anniversary celebration was held on 3 October 2014.

References

External links
 Prince Andrew School
 

Buildings and structures in Saint Helena
Schools in Saint Helena, Ascension and Tristan da Cunha
Educational institutions established in 1989
1989 establishments in British Overseas Territories
Secondary schools in British Overseas Territories
Educational organisations based in Saint Helena